This is a list of players who played at least one game for the Phoenix Roadrunners of the World Hockey Association from 1974–75 to 1976–77.



B
Bob Barlow,
Serge Beaudoin,
Wendell Bennett,
Don Borgeson,
Jim Boyd,
Duane Bray,

C
Jim Clarke,
Cam Connor,
Michel Cormier,

D
Blair Davidson,
Barry Dean,

E
Grant Erickson,

F
Robbie Ftorek,

G
Dave Gorman,
John Gray,

H
Del Hall,
Hugh Harris,
Clay Hebenton,
Andre Hinse,
Mike Hobin,
Frank Hughes,
John Hughes,
Ron Huston,

K
Murray Keogan,
Gary Kurt,

L
Garry Lariviere,
Bob Liddington,

M
Al McLeod,
Peter McNamee,
John Migneault,
Lauri Mononen,
Bob Mowat,

N
Rick Newell,
Jim Niekamp,
Jack Norris,

O
Gerry Odrowski,

P
Jan Popiel,

R
Pekka Rautakallio,
Seppo Repo,
Jerry Rollins,

S
Mike Sleep,
Dennis Sobchuk,
Gene Sobchuk,
Mike Stevens,

T
Juhani Tamminen,

V
Gary Veneruzzo,

Z
Howie Young,

References
Phoenix Roadrunners (WHA) all-time player roster at hockeydb.com

Phoenix Roadrunners
Phoenix Roadrunners players